The Leader is a 2019 Chinese animated web series based on the life of German philosopher Karl Marx. Commissioned by the Communist Party of China's Marxism office, a production team was formed in 2016 which included propaganda departments, scholars of Marxism, and the Chinese Academy of Social Sciences. The series was announced in 2018 by the streaming service Bilibili as part of the celebration of the 200th anniversary of Marx's birth. The seven-episode series was created to attract young people to Marxism, and it was streamed weekly on Bilibili between January 28, and March 4, 2019. A webcomic version was produced by Zhong Jun, the series' chief scriptwriter.

The series' announcement attracted international interest, and its promotional video had over 200,000 views on its release day. It was primarily considered propaganda by the Western media, while Chinese viewers commented on Marx's good looks. The series had a mixed response; the first episode had over 2.8 million views in one day, and the series as a whole had at least 5.5 million views. Although it was criticized for poor animation, propagandism, and its depiction of Marx, it has sparked a discussion on Marxism and labor rights in China.

Plot 
The Leader revolves around the life of German philosopher Karl Marx, focusing on his political and economic theories, his romance with Jenny von Westphalen, and his friendship with Friedrich Engels. In a press release, Marx was described as "a great man standing upright between heaven and earth, whose ideological system established through his entire life awakened all sleeping proletariat across the world and deeply influenced the historical development of the world". He was also characterized as "an ordinary man of flesh and blood", whose love for Jenny and friendship with Engels "became legendary".

The series depicts Marx's life from his graduation from Trier High School in 1835 to his college years, where his philosophy changes from Kantianism to Hegelianism. His early affiliation with the Young Hegelians and his work on the newspaper Rheinische Zeitung are portrayed. Marx's exiles and ideological feuds with Ludwig Feuerbach, Pierre-Joseph Proudhon, and others are also shown. The poverty of his family is explored, and Marx's participation in the International Workingmen's Association and conflicts with Mikhail Bakunin are highlighted. The series ends with his death and the worldwide impact of his ideas.

Production 
The series was commissioned by China's Marxism office, an initiative of the Communist Party of China which was established in 2004. The series was conceived as part of the Chinese government's celebration of the 200th anniversary of Marx's birth. A production team to develop The Leader web series and related merchandise such as emoji, stage plays, and theme songs was formed in 2016. The series was produced by the Wawayu animation studio in partnership with the Chinese Academy of Social Sciences, the government-owned People's Daily newspaper, the think tank Weiming Culture Media, the Inner Mongolia Film Group, the Propaganda Department of the Inner Mongolia Autonomous Region Party Committee, and the Communist Youth League Central Propaganda Department.

The series' chief scriptwriter was Zhong Jun, deputy director of the Inner Mongolia Autonomous Region Party Committee Propaganda Department and a researcher at the Chinese Academy of Social Sciences. Other scholars of Marxism were involved in the scripting, with the production team focused on accuracy rather than storytelling. The staff did not want the series to pander to the demands of the entertainment industry, where there is "no way to make very careful and precise or very accurate descriptions." Its production conformed with the Chinese Communist Party general secretary Xi Jinping's demand for people to remember China's socialist past while pursuing the "great rejuvenation of the Chinese nation" and his belief that they should be familiar with Marx, whom he called the "greatest thinker in human history". Marx was treated as "an ordinary person" by the producers, who tried to depict him as a real person rather than a "legendary god".

The series reflects government officials' belief that rigid political lectures are unattractive to a generation with easy access to a booming entertainment market. Zhuo Sina, a member of The Leader staff, said that although voluminous literature exists about Marx, none of it is "in a format that young people can accept". To fill this gap, the producers intended to convey a "positive understanding" of him and hoped that it would spark interest in his life; according to scriptwriter Zhong, the series was intended to popularize Marxism and give Marx a "new shine". The producers said that they tried to make Marx and Engels more approachable and less serious to a young audience. The target audience influenced the series' theme song, design, and plot. Its German setting went through a sinicization, and the characters were designed according to the "aesthetic preferences of young people" (described as realism).

Broadcast
On December 18, 2018, the streaming platform Bilibili released a trailer and announced on the Sina Weibo social media site that it would soon stream the series. It was scheduled to begin streaming on January 28, 2019; that day, the first two episodes were released on the platform. The following episodes were released weekly on Bilibili, and the final episode was released on March 4, 2019.

A comic-book version (manhua) with the same name was created as a spin-off of the series by the production team. Written by Zhong Jun, it has been published by Zhejiang Juvenile and Children's Publishing House since January 2019. The series resumed after forty-two chapters, all of which are available on the Bilibili website.

Episode list

Reception

Initial reaction and viewership
The announcement of an animated series based on the young Karl Marx attracted international media interest. The announcement "[took] the web by storm", according to Mercedes Milligan of Animation Magazine. Its promotional video was watched 211,000 times on Bilibili and over 41,000 times on Twitter within the first 24 hours of release, and 37,000 users were following the series page for notifications of new episodes. Some Internet users were skeptical about the series, however, saying that its depiction of the main characters was "too good looking to be true". Marx's handwriting was noted as much neater than it was in reality. Some students called the series "ridiculous" because "[t]he political element is too obvious", but others considered it a "really interesting experiment".

The production of a Marx series by the Chinese government was primarily thought to be a propagandistic attempt to convey its ideology to future generations. Mandy Zuo of the South China Morning Post noted that "his image has been a common feature on official propaganda throughout the year". Didi Tang wrote for The Times that the series was consistent with previous government productions, such as the television show Marx Got It Right. Tang called it an "effort by the ruling party to spark an interest in Marx among young people", when Chinese millennials are not fully satisfied with their working conditions. Milligan of Animation Magazine felt that the production was in line with the growing popularity of socialism and communism among the young, and "it was only a matter of time before this trend made inroads in animation".

When the series was announced, Rosemarie Ho of The Outline and Lorenzo Fantoni of Esquire noted the depiction of Marx and Engels' friendship and its relationship to yaoi (male homosexual-themed anime). Fantoni said that there was no hint of it, but Ho believed that the series would encourage the production of fan-made Marx–Engels yaoi. Comments were posted on Bilibili by viewers who inferred a homosexual relationship between Marx and Engels. They sparked a "critical backlash", according to Fan Shuhong of Radii China, with some users reporting the posts because they "are slander against these great thinkers".

The first episode of The Leader was watched more than 2.8 million times on its release day, and Inkstone News called it a "hit". After the premiere, 355,000 Bilibili users requested notifications of upcoming episodes. By February 2019, the series was reportedly streamed over 5.5 million times on Bilibili. The German radio station Deutschlandfunk Kultur noted that its number of views was not enough to place the series among the most popular Bilibili content, however, and Agence France-Presse considered it an unimpressive figure for a country of 1.4 billion people. As the series continued, so did international interest.

Critical response and impact
Shanghai-based newspaper Sixth Tone reported that although the December trailer "generated buzz", the series' debut had a mixed response from Chinese viewers "who have paid more attention to Marx's high cheekbones and good looks than his theories". On the Chinese social networking website Douban, users rated it two out of five. Some called the storytelling "awkward", and others were more graphically critical. Bilibili users complained that the series was poorer in quality than Japanese anime, with some users comparing it to a PowerPoint presentation.

According to Chinese youth culture and media researcher Jeroen de Kloet of the University of Amsterdam, there was too much dialogue and too few scenes to "humanize" Marx: "It's the government lecturing young people on what Marxism is about". Christina Xu, a researcher of Chinese Internet culture, called the series "part of the push for soft power" by the Chinese government. Shanghai-based political scientist Chen Daoyin said that The Leader was "an effective way" for the Chinese government to educate a new generation about its version of Marxism since young people "will be more willing to accept Marxism if they get to know Marx as a person first". Chen concluded, "The ultimate goal is to make them recognize the party's official ideology and its legitimacy to rule".

Two pieces of Deutschlandfunk Kultur commented that Marx looked like a 19th-century hipster in the series. One of the articles also contained commentary from a Beijing-based "critical author" identified as Chen. He criticized the series because it "makes Marx seem extremely sympathetic". According to Chen, "Marx is always the picture on the wall, full-bearded", and "this image is not that popular ... they are now making a cartoon about Marx to reach young people" and change his image. The Beijing author also said that it was a way to adapt propaganda to the social media era, since "conventional propaganda methods are too old-fashioned". The other article reported that the series tried to make Marx look like a superhero. Sutirtho Patranobis of Hindustan Times agreed, saying that it "is an effort to make the ideologue accessible and popular among teenagers in the country".

The series has opened a space for discussion of Marxism and labor rights in China. The Jasic Incident, a labor-rights conflict involving Peking University Marxist Society students which school authorities tried to suppress, was cited ironically by users when Marx is threatened by his university in the series. Tom Hancock of the Financial Times found the depiction of Marx clashing with government censors, praising worker uprisings and demanding the abolition of private property surprising, since the Chinese government plays down the concept of class struggle in its official policy.

Notes

References

External links 
 Official page at Bilibili

Anime-influenced animation
Chinese webcomics
Chinese web series
Works about Karl Marx